Michael Frey (born 19 July 1994) is a Swiss professional footballer who plays as a forward for Bundesliga club Schalke 04, on loan from Belgian club Royal Antwerp.

Club career
In June 2017, Frey signed a four-year contract with FC Zürich.

In August 2018, Frey joined Turkish club Fenerbahçe for a reported transfer fee of €2.64 million. He signed a four-year deal. After his first season in Turkey, Frey joined 2. Bundesliga side 1. FC Nürnberg on loan for the 2019–20 season. The club retained an option to make the move permanent.

On 17 June 2021, Fenerbahçe announced that Frey had joined Antwerp on a permanent deal after an impressive loan spell with Waasland-Beveren in the Belgian First Division A during the 2020–21 season. On 8 August 2021, Frey scored all five goals for Antwerp in their 5–2 league win over Standard Liège.

On 20 January 2023, after three and a half seasons in Belgium, he was loaned to German side Schalke 04, newly promoted to the Bundesliga, with an option to make the deal permanent.

Career statistics

References

External links
Switzerland U21 stats

1994 births
Living people
People from Münsingen
Sportspeople from the canton of Bern
Swiss men's footballers
Association football forwards
Switzerland under-21 international footballers
Switzerland youth international footballers
BSC Young Boys players
Lille OSC players
FC Luzern players
FC Zürich players
Fenerbahçe S.K. footballers
1. FC Nürnberg players
FC Münsingen players
S.K. Beveren players
Royal Antwerp F.C. players
FC Schalke 04 players
Swiss Super League players
Ligue 1 players
2. Bundesliga players
Belgian Pro League players
Bundesliga players
Swiss expatriate footballers
Swiss expatriate sportspeople in France
Expatriate footballers in France
Swiss expatriate sportspeople in Turkey
Expatriate footballers in Turkey
Swiss expatriate sportspeople in Belgium
Expatriate footballers in Belgium
Swiss expatriate sportspeople in Germany
Expatriate footballers in Germany